GLIFAA (Gays and Lesbians in Foreign Affairs Agencies) is the officially recognized organization representing lesbian, gay, bisexual and transgender etc. (LGBT+) personnel and their families in the United States Department of State, U.S. Agency for International Development (USAID),  Foreign Commercial Service, Foreign Agricultural Service, and other agencies and entities working in foreign affairs in the U.S. Government.  The acronym comes from its original name, Gays and Lesbians in Foreign Affairs Agencies.  As of 2014, the organization goes by GLIFAA and uses the slogan "LGBT+ pride in foreign affairs agencies" to underscore its inclusive composition.  GLIFAA was founded in 1992 by fewer than a dozen employees who faced official harassment and potential loss of their jobs simply because of their sexual orientation. The organization has grown to hundreds of  Foreign Service, Civil Service, and contract personnel and their families serving in Washington, throughout the U.S., and at U.S. embassies and missions around the world.  Members also include retirees and straight allies in government agencies, while other supporters are affiliate members.

Among other accomplishments, GLIFAA succeeded in pressing for the issuance  of a non-discrimination policy by Secretary of State Warren Christopher in 1994, and worked with the  U.S. Administration, the management of government agencies, and other employee associations to eliminate barriers for obtaining security clearances and create and implement non-discrimination policies with regard to entry and employment in the U.S. Foreign Service and Civil Service. In addition, the organization worked to improve the situation for the partners of LGBT U.S. Foreign Service personnel serving overseas. GLIFAA met with Secretaries of State Colin Powell, Condoleezza Rice, and Hillary Clinton.

History of LGBT Americans in diplomacy

Prior to the early 1990s, homosexuality was grounds for exclusion from the U.S. Foreign Service (diplomatic corps) and many positions in the Civil Service. Numerous individuals were dismissed from their positions in the State Department and in the U.S. government because of their sexual orientation. This happened particularly in the 1950s and 60's, during what has been called the "Lavender Scare" against sexual minorities in the U.S. government, linked to the McCarthy-inspired campaign against perceived communist sympathizers.

The first publicly gay U.S. ambassador was Ambassador to Luxembourg James Hormel, who was appointed by President Clinton and sworn in by Secretary of State Madeleine Albright in 1999. Hormel was admitted into his position through a recess appointment, without confirmation of the U.S. Senate. The second publicly gay U.S. ambassador, and the first publicly gay Foreign Service officer to be appointed as ambassador, was U.S. Ambassador to Romania Michael E. Guest, who was appointed by President George W. Bush and in 2001 sworn in by Secretary of State Colin Powell. Bush also appointed publicly gay physician Mark R. Dybul as the United States Global AIDS Coordinator, with the rank of ambassador.  In December 2009, Vice President Joseph Biden swore in publicly gay lawyer David Huebner, as U.S. Ambassador to New Zealand and the Independent State of Samoa.

GLIFAA's advocacy and efforts

In January 2009, GLIFAA handed to Secretary of State Clinton a letter signed by 2200 foreign affairs employees requesting that a number of key benefits be extended to same-sex domestic partners of LGBT personnel at the State Department and other foreign affairs agencies. The organization noted that these were benefits that could be accorded without violating the Defense of Marriage Act, which sharply curtails the ability of the U.S. federal government to assist LGBT families in some ways. In May 2009, an internal State Department memo extended a number of benefits to the same-sex partners of American diplomats, including diplomatic passports, use of medical facilities at overseas posts, medical and other emergency evacuation, transportation between posts, and training in security and languages. In June 2009, President Obama signed a memorandum announcing these and number of other benefits for same-sex partners of government workers. Many of the new benefits had come from GLIFAA's initial proposals.

GLIFAA has held numerous events in Washington and at U.S. embassies around the world. For example, in July 2005 GLIFAA members held a meeting at the U.S. Embassy in Baghdad, Iraq. Speakers at GLIFAA events in Washington have included openly gay Congressman Jim Kolbe and Judy Shepard, mother of slain gay student Matthew Shepard. In June 2010, Secretary of State Clinton and USAID Administrator Rajiv Shah spoke at a GLIFAA-sponsored event at the main State Department building on the topic of "LGBT Human Rights and U.S. Foreign Policy." At the event, Secretary Clinton stated that the U.S. government would take a more assertive role in protecting the rights of LGBT people and communities around the world.

In October 2009, GLIFAA won the 2009 Out and Equal Workplace Award for its advocacy efforts. Secretary of State Clinton videotaped a congratulatory message that was shown at the conference where the award was given.

Members
Ted Osius, one of the founding members, became U.S. Ambassador to Vietnam in 2014.
Robert S. Gilchrist, former president of GLIFAA, became U.S. Ambassador to Lithuania in 2020.

See also

LGBT rights in the United States
List of LGBT rights organizations

Notes

External links
Official website

1992 establishments in the United States
Government-related professional associations
LGBT organizations in the United States
LGBT professional associations
United States Department of State
United States Agency for International Development
History of LGBT civil rights in the United States
Organizations established in 1992
LGBT culture in Washington, D.C.